Michael Brian Morrison (born 3 March 1988) is an English professional footballer who plays as a centre back for Cambridge United.

Morrison began his senior career in the Conference National with Cambridge United. After three years as a first-team player, he moved on to Leicester City, contributing to their promotion to the Championship in 2009. He spent the second half of the 2010–11 season with Sheffield Wednesday of League One before moving to another League One club, Charlton Athletic. He helped Charlton gain promotion to the Championship in his first season, was appointed vice-captain, and played regularly until 2014, when he joined another Championship club, Birmingham City, initially on loan.

While a Cambridge United player, he represented England at semi-professional level.

Career

Cambridge United
Morrison was born in Bury St Edmunds, Suffolk. He grew up in nearby Haverhill, and attended Castle Manor School. He started his football career with Cambridge United, where he came through their youth academy and at the age of 15 became the youngest player to ever feature for their reserve side. He made his debut for Cambridge United in October 2005 against Halifax Town when he was aged 17, and was voted young player of the year for three years in row between 2006 and 2008. He appeared for England Cthe team that represents England at semi-professional levelagainst Finland in November 2007 and against Wales in May 2008 when England retained the Four Nations Tournament title.

Leicester City
Morrison joined Leicester City on 2 July 2008, signing a two-year contract for an undisclosed fee. Pleased at joining Leicester, Morrison believed his transfer was in the best interests of Cambridge, who could have lost him on a free transfer. He saw manager Nigel Pearson as his mentor due to his past experience as a defender. Morrison made his professional debut in a 2–0 win over Milton Keynes Dons on 9 August, and scored his first goal in a 4–2 win over Huddersfield Town on 24 January 2009. He returned to the first-team line-up in November 2008 after Patrick Kisnorbo was ruled out by injury. Helping Leicester win promotion as champions, he ended their last home game of the season by scoring two goals against Scunthorpe United on 24 April, the night they received the League One trophy.

Happy to fight for a first-team spot in the 2009–10 season, Morrison's squad number was changed from 15 to 4. On 6 October 2009, Morrison signed a two-year contract extension with Leicester, to run until June 2012. He scored his first goal of the season in a 2–1 home win over Sheffield United on Boxing Day. Morrison took over the right back role in January 2010, after a poor display from teammate Robbie Neilson.

Sheffield Wednesday
On 7 January 2011, Morrison signed for Sheffield Wednesday on a three-and-a-half-year contract for an undisclosed fee.

Charlton Athletic
On 12 July 2011, Morrison joined League One side Charlton Athletic on a three-year contract for an undisclosed fee. He quickly established himself as a key member of Chris Powell's team, winning League One Player of the Month for November 2011. He established himself as the team's first choice centre-half during the 2012–13 Championship campaign, in which the Addicks finished in ninth place. On 24 June 2014, Morrison signed a two-year contract extension, keeping him at the club until 2016.

Birmingham City

Morrison joined Birmingham City on 31 October 2014 on a two-month emergency loan. He went straight into the starting eleven for the following day's goalless draw at Wolverhampton Wanderers, and kept his place thereafter, establishing himself as centre-back of choice alongside captain Paul Robinson. In December, it was announced that Morrison would sign a three-and-a-half-year contract with Birmingham once his loan ended and the January transfer window opened. His loan was initially extended for a few days to ensure his eligibility for the third-round FA Cup tie against Blyth Spartans, when he captained the team, and the permanent move was confirmed on 5 January 2015.

Morrison left the club after his contract expired in June 2019, after failing to agree a new deal.

Reading
On 19 July 2019, Morrison joined another Championship club, Reading, on a two-year contract. He scored his first goal for the club to complete a 2–0 league win against Huddersfield Town on 24 August.

On 11 May 2021, Morrison signed a new one-year contract with Reading.

Portsmouth
On 26 July 2022, Portsmouth announced the signing of Morrison on a one-year contract.

Cambridge United
On 26 January 2023, Morrison re-joined Cambridge United, on a one-and-a-half year contract.

International career
Morrison represented England at semi professional level during his time at Cambridge United playing for the England C, sometimes known as the National Game XI. He played against Finland in November 2007 and against Wales in May 2008 when England retained the Four Nations Tournament title.

Career statistics

Honours
Leicester City
Football League One: 2008–09

Charlton Athletic
Football League One: 2011–12

Individual
PFA Team of the Year: 2011–12 League One

References

External links

Leicester City profile

1988 births
Living people
Sportspeople from Bury St Edmunds
People from Haverhill, Suffolk
Footballers from Suffolk
English footballers
England semi-pro international footballers
Association football defenders
Cambridge United F.C. players
Leicester City F.C. players
Sheffield Wednesday F.C. players
Charlton Athletic F.C. players
Birmingham City F.C. players
Reading F.C. players
National League (English football) players
English Football League players